Rear Admiral Adeniyi Adejimi Osinowo  (born 8 November 1964) was the 16th Commandant of the National Defence College, Abuja, Nigeria and the Flag Officer Commanding Naval Training Command.

Early life 
Adeniyi Adejimi Osinowo was born on 8 November 1964 in the ancient city of Ibadan, Old Western Region, Nigeria, to George Adekite Osinowo, a former chief magistrate of Nigeria's old Western State, and Esther Osinowo, a teacher. His Osinowo family of Iperu, Ogun State descended from the Agbeja Compound in Imodu Jade, Ijebu Ode, and the Odusina Lapeni lineage in the Odoru ruling house of Iperu. His early education was at Ibadan before attending Ijebu Ode Grammar School between 1975 and 1980.

Military career 
Professional Training: Osinowo started his military career in 1981 at the Nigerian Naval College and he served for 38 years before retiring in March 2019. He underwent several military and professional courses while in service. These include Sub Lt Technical Course at India Navy Ship Venduruthy 1985–86, Specialist Communications Course at NNS Quorra 1991–92, Principal Warfare Officers at Nigerian Naval College 1993, Junior and Senior Staff Courses at the Armed Forces Command and Staff College Jaji 1992/98, Port Policy and Management Course Malta 2000, International Joint Operations Planning Course at HMS Dryad UK, and Higher Defence Management Course at the National Defence College Abuja 2008.

Academic Training: Adejimi graduated from the Obafemi Awolowo University in 1991 with a First-Class Honors degree in Electronic/Electrical Engineering. Subsequent post-graduate degrees pursued include master's degree in Electrical Engineering (University of Lagos 1991–93), a Post-Graduate Diploma in International Relations and Strategic Studies (Lagos State University1999-2000), a Master's degree in International Affairs and Diplomacy (Ahmadu Bello University 2001–02), and Post Graduate Diploma in Education (National Open University 2018–19). He completed the Post Graduate Diploma in Strategy and Innovation at the University of Oxford Said Business School between March 2021 and April 2022.Sea Service: Apart from duties onboard Nigerian Navy Ships Ruwan Yard, Obuma, Enyimiri, Barama, Ayam, and Ekun, his sea service included command of Nigerian Navy Ship SIRI (2005–06) and operational deployments with several navies in the Gulf of Guinea, the Caribbean and the Mediterranean under various operations and exercises. Between 2009 and 2010 he was appointed onboard US Navy Ship Gunston Hall as deputy commander of the multi-national Africa Partnership Station Mission.

Command and Staff:  Key appointments included Military Observer United Nations Peace Forces in the Former Yugoslavia (1994–95), Officer-in-Charge Communications School (1997–98), Staff Officer Operations Western Fleet (2003–04), Commanding Officer Naval Drafting Command (2005), Director of Naval Signals Naval Headquarters (2006–07), Director Marine Services (2007–08), and Directing Staff at the Armed Forces Command and Staff College (2001–03) and the National Defense College (2012–13).

As the pioneer Director of Transformation, he managed the development of the Nigerian Navy Transformation Plan 2011-20 and was one of the experts selected to develop the African Union Commission Integrated Maritime Strategy, (AIMS 2050) between 2010 and 2013, as well as the ECOWAS Integrated Maritime Strategy EIMS (2011–2014). Other key appointments included, pioneer Director Project Implementation Monitoring and Evaluation, Naval Headquarters (2013–2014), Flag Officer Commanding Naval Training Command (2015–16), Chief of Training and Operations Naval Headquarters, (2016–17), Member Governing Board of the Nigerian Maritime Administration and Safety Agency (NIMASA), and the 16th Commandant of the National Defense College, Nigeria (2017–19).

Awards 
Osinowo is a recipient of the Command-at-Sea Award, Forces Service Star, Meritorious Service Star, Distinguished Service Star and General Service Star. He is an also a recipient of the United Nations operations medal (UNPROFOR/UNPF). He was awarded the Humanitarian Service Medal by the U.S. Navy in 2010 and the Meritorious Service Medal by the U.S. President in 2011.

Publication 

 Royal Australian Navy in the 21st Century – Strategic Thoughts, 2004. 
 Africa Partnership Station Helps All Sides, 2011. 
 Right-Sizing African Navies for Maritime Security. (Lecture delivered at the Africa Centre for Strategic Studies Conference on Maritime Security), Dar es Salaam Tanzania April 2010.
 Maritime Security: Empowering the African Union to Revolutionalise the Africa’s Maritime Sector. (Lecture delivered to National Defence College Course 24) Abuja June 2013.
 Operationalisation of ECOWAS Maritime Security Pilot Zone E: Potential Contribution to the Prevention of Crude Oil Theft. (Lecture delivered at the Nigerian Navy Week Celebrations) Calabar May 2014.
 Combating Piracy in the Gulf of Guinea. ACSS Africa Security Briefs, March 2015.
 Doctrine Development, (Lecture delivered to National Defence College Course 24) Abuja June 2015.
 Maritime Security and the Africa’s Integrated Maritime Strategy 2050: Their Economic Impact on Africa. (Lecture delivered at the AU Heads of Government Summit on Maritime Security Safety and Development in Africa) Lome Togo October 2016.
 Maritime Domain Awareness: Imperatives for Gulf of Guinea Navies (Lead Paper delivered to Nigerian Navy 60th Anniversary Conference) Lagos May 2016.
 Combating the Menace of Piracy and Other Maritime Crimes in Africa (Lead Paper delivered at the Africa’s Association of Maritime Administrations Conference) Abuja May 2017
 Ensuring Safe and Secure Waterways Transportation. (Lead Presentation at the World Maritime Day Celebrations) Lagos October 2017.
 Strategic Lenses Series 1: Security and National Development. (Editor-in-Chief), National Defence College publication. 2018
 Strategic Lenses Series 2: Defence and National Security. (Editor-in-Chief), National Defence College publication. 2018.
 Iconic Soldier and Peacemaker: A Biography of Martin Luther Agwai, (Editor-in-Chief), May University Press. 2019.

References 

1964 births
Living people